Kujō Michiie (九条 道家) (July 28, 1193 — April 1, 1252) was a Japanese regent in the 13th century. He was the father of Kujō Yoritsune and grandson of Kujō Kanezane (also known as Fujiwara no Kanezane). He was the father of Norizane and Yoritsune. His third son Ichijō Sanetsune was the founding father of Ichijō family, while his second son Nijō Yoshizane founded Nijō family.

The Kujō family were sponsors of the Kitano Shrine.

In 1219, Kujō Michiie offered an emakimono named "Kitano Tenjin Engi Emaki" (Illustrated Scroll of the History of the Kitano Shrine) to the Kitano shrine. He gave an enlarged version of the history to the Kitano shrine in 1223.

In 1226, Michiie managed to have his son Yoritsune appointed fourth shōgun of the Kamakura shogunate.

In 1238, he ordained as a Buddhist monk.

Family
 Father: Kujō Yoshitsune
 Mother: Ichijō Yoshiyasu’s daughter
 Wife and Children:
 Wife: Sainonji Rinshi (1192-1251)
 Kujō Norizane
 Nijō Yoshizane
 Kujō Yoritsune
 Ichijō Sanetsune
 Enjitsu（?-1272）
 Jigen （?-1255）
 Hōjo (1227-1284)
 Kujō Shunshi married Emperor Go-Horikawa
 Kujo Jinshi married Konoe Kanetsune
 Shijo Emperor’s wet-nurse
 Wife: Minamoto no Arimasa’s daughter
 ??? (深忠)
 Wife: Minamoto no Shigemichi
 Jitsu （1238?-1300?）
 Unknown
 ??? (行昭;1231?-1303）
 ??? (道智)
 ??? (道意)
 Shoshin (1236?-1287)

References 

 

1193 births
1252 deaths
Fujiwara clan
Kujō family
People of Heian-period Japan
People of Kamakura-period Japan
Kamakura period Buddhist clergy